India has studied, produced and used various strategic and tactical missile systems since its independence. Decades long projects have realised development of all types of missile systems including ballistic, cruise, anti-ship, air-defence, air-to-air and anti-missile systems. India is one of seven countries in the world with intercontinental ballistic missiles (ICBMs) and one of four countries with anti-ballistic missile systems. Since 2016, India has been a member of Missile Technology Control Regime (MTCR).

The use of rockets for warfare in India has been recorded in as early as the 18th century. Mysorean rockets were the first iron-cased rockets in world that were successfully deployed for military use. Mysore's conflict with East India Company exposed British to the technology leading to development of Congreve rockets and introduction of rocketry in Europe.

Research in missile technology resumed again after India's independence along with the weapons of mass destruction. Development of nuclear weapons was followed by various missile programs in 70s with development of various ballistic, cruise, surface to air, anti- ballistic missile and orbital launch systems. India conducted its first nuclear test and initiated with Project Devil as an attempt to reverse engineer Soviet surface to air missile SA-2 Guideline and Project Valiant to develop an intercontinental ballistic missile. However, it could not succeed and experience gained led to development of Prithvi series of short range ballistic-missiles. In early 80s, India conducted its first successful orbital launch and synchronized its research institutions under IGMDP and successfully developed a series of strategic missile systems. The project began in early 1980s and ended in 2008, after these strategic missiles were successfully developed. The last major missile developed under the program was the Agni 3 intermediate-range ballistic missile which was successfully tested on 9 July 2007. Since then, India has developed, tested, operationalized, and is developing several missile systems that are limited to only a handful of countries including ICBMs, ASATs, SLBMs and hypersonic weapon systems. Threats posed by enemy missile systems led to the pursuit of Indian Ballistic Missile Defense Programme.

In 2017, India produced most of defined MTCR defined missile technologies required to be integrated to produce most missile systems. As per G Satheesh Reddy, India achieved complete self reliance in missile technology.

History

Kingdom of Mysore 

Mysorean rockets were the first iron-cased rockets that were successfully deployed for military use. Kingdom of Mysore utilised them effectively in the conflicts against the British East India Company. In addition, wheeled rocket launchers capable of launching five to ten rockets almost simultaneously were used in war. These rockets were re-engineered as Congreve rockets by British opening the door of development of advanced rocketry further in Europe.

Post-independence 
Indian government constituted a teamd Special Weapons Development Team in 1958 to study guided missile systems.

The phase-I of missile program was limited to development of a first generation anti-tank guided missile (ATGM) by DRDO. Liquid fuel rocket engines based on Soviet missile system SA-2 were developed. Despite the overall failure of DRDO to develop a reliable ATGM, Indian laboratories had established facilities useful for machining and fabricating various parts of missile systems including gyroscopes, actuators, silver oxide-zinc
batteries, booster and sustainer motors, air frame hard-
ware such as fiberglass wings, ground launcher mecha-
nisms, and wire spool winding and reeling mechanisms. India later excepted the French offer to produce SS-11B anti-tank guided missiles in 1970s. In another phase initiated in 1970s, Project Devil to reverse engineer Soviet SA-2 Guideline and Project Valiant to develop an Inter-continental ballistic missile too ended up with limited success but imparting experience and facilities for further research on missiles and space rockets. DRDO simultaneously focused on building a guidance package – an essential part of a long-range missile that determines its path and accuracy to hit a target. A platform-based inertial navigation system (INS) was developed and tested, on board an Avro aircraft, in 1974–75. Subsequently, an INS was built for both missiles and an aircraft, and this was tested in 1979 on board a Canberra aircraft. Decade of 1980s witnessed India gaining significant grounds in rocket technology and various technology demonstration programs began which became the basis of modern rocket systems in India. DRDL had developed competencies in the fields of propulsion, navigation and manufacture of materials. Indian Space Research Organisation had successfully tested India's first orbital rocket SLV-3 in 1980 whose first stage was used in Agni-TD ballistic missile for technological demonstration of Agni missile family. This subsequently led to the birth of the Integrated Guided Missile Development Program and Dr. Abdul Kalam, who had previously been the project director for the SLV-3 programme at ISRO, was inducted as the DRDL Director in 1983 to conceive and lead it. He decided that DRDL would pursue multiple projects in this area simultaneously. Thus, four projects were born under the IGMDP; Short range surface-to-surface missile (code-named Prithvi), Short range low-level surface-to-air missile (code-named Trishul), Medium range surface-to-air missile (code-named Akash) and Third-generation anti-tank missile (code-named Nag).

The Agni missile was initially conceived in the IGMDP as a technology demonstrator project in the form of a re-entry vehicle, and was later upgraded to a ballistic missile with different ranges. As part of this program, the Interim Test Range at Balasore in Orissa was also developed for missile testing.

The fourth phase of India's missile program stretched from mid-1990s to early 21st century. BJP's tendency to nuclearise India's military has boosted the development and production of missiles. The phase has witnessed limited series production of DRDO's missiles and their deployment in battlefields. DRDO further embarked on programs in developing submarine launched ballistic missile Sagarika, cruise missiles BrahMos, naval variant of Prithvi Dhanush. Spanning from 1970s to 2000s, India's missile programs have transitioned into a self-sustaining character. Over the period from then, India has made improvements in technology of its missile systems and has produced many missile systems including ICBMs, anti-ballistic missiles, air-to-air missiles, cruise missiles and other systems.

Diplomatic and technological hurdles 
After India test-fired the first Prithvi missile in 1988, and the Agni missile in 1989, the Missile Technology Control Regime (then an informal grouping established in 1987 by Canada, France, Germany, Italy, Japan, the United Kingdom and the United States) decided to restrict access to any technology that would help India in its missile development program. Some of the major technology which was denied, included:

 phase shifters for the phased array radars for Akash (denied by the USA).
 magnesium alloy used in Prithvi's wings (denied by Germany).
 servo-valves needed for the electro-hydraulic control systems of Agni and Prithvi.
 gyroscopes and accelerometers (denied by France).
 processors – Intel said it would not give India chips for the computers used in Prithvi and Agni.

To counter the MTCR, the IGMDP team formed a consortium of DRDO laboratories, industries and academic institutions to build these sub-systems, components and materials. Though this slowed down the progress of the program, India successfully developed indigenously all the restricted components denied to it by the MTCR.

In 2011, the DRDO Chief V K Saraswat had stated that "indigenous content" in India's strategic missiles had gone up to such a level, with ring-laser gyros, composite rocket motors, micro-navigation systems etc., that "no technology control regime" could derail them any longer.

Missile Programs and Series

Abandoned programs

DRDO Anti Tank Missile 

In 1959, Indian agencies conducted feasibility study to develop a first generation wire guided anti-tank missile.DRDO Anti Tank Missile. Sino-Indian war in 1962 induced the government to fund the project. Designing and wind tunnel tests went on to develop an ATGM of a range of 0.5 to 2 km with flight speed of about 90 m/s. The missile was terminated eventually in 1969 once Indian army upgraded its requirements of an ATGM of range from 1.6 km to 2 km.

Project Devil: Surface to Air Missile 

The aim of Project Devil was to reverse engineer Soviet SA-2 Guideline missile to produce an indigenous short range surface to air missile. The program initially waned in favour of Project Valiant but was revived later after 1974. Although DRDL had developed and tested various systems for the missile, it later was completely cancelled in 1980 due to disputes between officials and technologies were utilised in other missile programs.

Project Valiant: Intercontinental Ballistic Missile 

Project Valiant was one of two early liquid-fuelled missile projects developed by India, along with Project Devil in the 1970s. Valiant missile was envisaged as an 85 tonnes liquid fueled three-staged ICBM. The missile although could reach near the stages of grounding testing, DRDO's interest in program waned due to internal disputes. ISRO was later approached with an offer to use missile for civilian uses which they declined leading to overall closure of the project. Although discontinued in 1974 without achieving full success, Project Valiant, like Project Devil, helped in the development of the Prithvi missile in the 1980s. Though never reached fruition, the projects were important precursors to the Prithvi missile developed in the 1980s.

Trishul 

Trishul was a short range surface to air missile to be used against low flying and sea-skimming targets. The range of the missile is 12 km and is fitted with a 15 kg warhead. The overall weight of the missile is 130 kg. Due to delay in development time and various deficiencies, Trishul could never enter production and service beyond testing and was substituted by Israeli Barak 1 missile. The project was officially closed in 2008 and DRDO embarked on more surface to air missile programs later.

Successful and ongoing programs

Integrated Guided Missile Development Program 

The Integrated Guided Missile Development Program (IGMDP) was a Ministry of Defence (India) programme for the research and development of a comprehensive range of missiles. The program was managed by the Defence Research and Development Organisation (DRDO) and Ordnance Factories Board in partnership with other Indian government research organisations. The program envisaged development of five strategic systems. Prithvi series of short ranged ballistic missiles, Trishul low altitude, short range surface to air missile, Akash medium range surface to air missile and Nag third generation anti-tank guided missile followed by Agni series of medium and long range ballistic missiles. The project began in early 1980s and ended in 2008 after these strategic missiles were successfully developed. The last major missile developed under the program was the Agni 3 intermediate-range ballistic missile which was successfully tested on 9 July 2007.

On 8 January 2008, the DRDO formally announced the successful completion of the IGMDP. It added that the strategic integrated guided missile program was completed with its design objectives achieved since most of the missiles in the program had been developed and inducted by the Indian armed forces.

Further variants of Prithvi missile, Akash-NG, Agni-IV, Agni-V, Agni-VI and Agni based K missile family went ahead later as independent projects.

Akash 

Akash is a medium-range mobile surface-to-air missile system developed by the Defence Research and Development Organisation (DRDO), Ordnance Factories Board and Bharat Electronics Limited (BEL) in India. The missile system can target aircraft, cruise missiles, air to surface missiles and ballistic missiles up to 30 km to 60  km away, at altitudes up to 18,000 m. Variants like Akash-1S and Akash-NG have longer ranges, higher accuracy, higher mobility and lower reaction time.

Anti-tank missiles 

Nag, also referred as Prospina, is the currently serving third generation "Fire-and-forget" anti-tank guided missile developed under the Integrated Guided Missile Development Program (IGMDP). Nag also has its man-portable, helicopter mounted, Stand-off and IFV mounted versions.

Besides Nag, BDL's Amogha series is currently undergoing trials and will have land-attack, man-portable and air launched variants. Armament Research and Development Establishment (ARDE) is testing a laser guided, tank gun launched SAMHO missile able to destroy tanks and low flying helicopters. Besides state-run programmes, Indian private firms have been emerging with ATGM systems.

Tactical ballistic missiles 

Prithvi missiles were tactical surface-to-surface short-range ballistic missiles (SRBM) and were first ballistic missiles to be developed and enter service in India. Dhanush or navalised Prithvi is a system consisting of a stabilisation platform (Bow) and the Missile (Arrow). It is intended for the Indian Navy, to be fired from ships against other ships or land targets.

Solid fueled Prahar and Pranash are being tested to replace existing Prithvi missiles. Export variant "Pragati" was exhibited in South Korea in 2013 but didn't receive any orders. Pralay is another battlefield range ballistic missile with better range being developed from PDV anti-ballistic missile.

Agni series and Surya 

The Agni missile series began as a "Re-Entry Vehicle" project (later rechristened as Agni Technology Demonstrator) in the IGMDP. It subsequently gave rise to the series of India's medium range, intermediate range and intercontinental ballistic missiles. Agni-I, Agni-II and Agni-III missiles were developed under the Integrated Guided Missile Development Program.

Longer range Agni-IV and Agni-V with intercontinental ranges and MIRV emerged in early 2010s as separate projects.

Agni-P, an upgraded successor of Agni-I and Agni-II was tested in 2021 with ability to carry maneuverable reentry vehicle (MaRV). Agni-P has improved propellant, navigation and guided systems and reportedly can be used as an ASBM against aircraft carriers.

Agni-VI is another Intercontinental ballistic missile reported to be in rudimentary stages of development by India, and until May 2012 was not officially confirmed by either the Government of India or the DRDO. Top DRDO scientists have previously asserted that India has almost all the equipment and technology needed to develop ICBMs, "but where the warhead should go or what the range should be will have to be a political call". Although, the actual status of missile always remained unknown in public domain. Sources have speculated that Agni-VI might be Surya under new codename.

K series 

K (named after Abdul Kalam) are submarine-launched ballistic missiles (SLBM) of India. SLBM variants of Agni missiles meant to arm India's nuclear submarines, their ranges vary from medium-range K-15 to intercontinental range K-6 (missile).

The Shaurya missile is a land attack variant of K-15 missile. The missile has a hypersonic speed and a hybrid ballistic-cruise trajectory.

BrahMos 

BrahMos (also known as PJ-10) are supersonic to hypersonic cruise missiles developed in collaboration between India and Russia. BrahMos have land attack, ship and submarine launched and air launched versions and are the fastest cruise missiles in world in operation. The existing versions of missiles include supersonic land-attack, anti-ship ship launched versions meanwhile longer range, hypersonic and air launched versions are under development.

Other cruise missile programs 

Nirbhay is the Indian long range sub-sonic Cruise Missile under development and testing, expecting its air and submarine launched version after trials. It was successfully test fired for second time from Balasore Orissa.
Able to travel at speed of 0.6-0.9 mach. However, its test on 12 October 2020 failed due to a technical snag. It has succeeded in other tests before and has been approved for limited production in 2020. An upgraded version of the missile is reportedly under development. It is currently deployed on LAC in limited numbers since 2020 due to 2020 China-India standoff.

Nirbhay project is now technically closed after completing six developmental trials. The next phase of tests will happen from April 2020 under a new name called Indigenous Technology Cruise Missile (ITCM). It will include Short Turbo Fan Engine (STFE) developed by Gas Turbine Research Establishment (GTRE) and a Radio-frequency (RF) seeker from Research Centre Imarat (RCI). A separate air-launched variant and submarine-launched variant is under active development. Several cruise missile systems are expected to be introduced from experience gained with Nirbhay.

Astra 

Astra are India's fifth-generation beyond-visual-range active radar homing air-to-air missile series.

A surface to air missile variant VL-SRSAM has also been developed from Astra to replace Indian navy's Barak 1 missiTN1 With supplementary Akash missile systems along, it forms a surface to air missile system similar to American NASAM 2.

Indian Ballistic Missile Defence Programme 

In wake of missile threats from China and Pakistan, the development of anti-ballistic missiles began in the late 1990s. The program consists of multiple phases and components. Phase-I of program is a double-tiered system consisting of two land and sea-based interceptor missiles, namely the Prithvi Air Defence (PAD) missile for high altitude interception, and the Advanced Air Defence (AAD) Missile for lower altitude interception. The two-tiered shield should be able to intercept any incoming missile launched from 5,000 kilometres away. The system also includes an overlapping network of early warning and tracking radars, as well as command and control posts. Phase-I is awaiting government's approval for installation over national capital. Phase-II would include more potent AD-1 and AD-2 anti-ballistic missiles capable of engaging without IRBMs, ICBMs and hypersonic cruise missiles. Prithvi Defence Vehicle (PDV) Mk. 1 and II are also under trials to intercept missiles at higher altitude and longer ranges and replace existing PAD. PDV Mk. 2 has also demonstrated anti-satellite capability.

Other systems 
Hypersonic Technology Demonstrator Vehicle (HSTDV) is a technology demonstrator aimed to demonstrate autonomous flight of a Scramjet Integrated Vehicle using ethylene. The technology is expected to become the basis of India's hypersonic missiles and aircraft in future. India has developed an Anti-Radiation Missile (ARM) that will help to destroy enemy advance warning systems. This was named as Rudram-1, with a range of 100–250 km. Production of the ARM is being done on a priority basis by the Defence Research and Development Laboratory (DRDL), which specialises in missile development.
Such missiles can be mounted on the Sukhoi Su-30 MKI fighter planes.

List of guided missiles

Air to air

Anti-radiation

Anti-satellite

Anti-ship

Anti-submarine

Anti-tank

Ballistic

Cruise

Surface to air

Ballistic Missile Defence

Other systems

Guided and unguided rocket systems

Research and development organisations 

Current missile research and development in India happens under the Defence Research and Development Laboratory (DRDL), and a group of laboratories collectively called the Missile Complex Laboratories.

 Interim Test Range
 Bharat Dynamics Limited Manufactures the missile and also has an associated R&D lab
 Composite Products Development Centre
 Defence Metallurgical Research Laboratory Develops materials for defence and space usage
 Dr APJ Abdul Kalam Missile Complex Houses following 3 laboratories:
 Advanced Systems Laboratory  Research and development on motors, jet vanes and structures for launch vehicles and missiles
 Research Centre Imarat (Develops navigation and electromechanical actuation systems)
 Defence Research and Development Laboratory (DRDL) famous for its contributions to Integrated Guided Missile Development Programme (IGMDP). Develops mission control software and among other missile related technologies.
 High Energy Materials Research Laboratory Develops propellant and explosives.
 Missile Complex Laboratories (These laboratories were earlier part of the DRDL or set up under them, but all are now independent entities)
 Missile Systems Quality Assurance Agency
 Vehicle Research and Development Establishment Develops missile launchers
 HTNP Industries Develops Hypersonic missile warheads (Nuclear capable and non nuclear capable)

See also

 Indian Armed Forces
 India-China Border Roads
 Indian Human Spaceflight Programme
 Indian weapons of mass destruction
 Indian military satellites

Notes and references

Citations

References

Notes

External links
Desi defence showpieces powered by videshi parts
 DRDO India's lumbering dinosaur